Arlind Sadiku (born 12 October 1989, in Pristina) is a Kosovan journalist and sports commentator. Currently he works in ArtMotion. He is expert in statistical analysis for local football.

Career
Sadiku entered the profession of journalism when he was 18. The first steps began in Klan Kosova where he worked for about a year and a half. Since 2010 he has been part of the DigitAlb/SuperSport team. In December 2013, the Association of Professional Journalists of Kosovo, Sports, awarded the prize "Ali Shala" for journalists with the best sports coverage of 2013. In May 2015 he was elected General Secretary of Sports Journalists Associacion of Kosovo. Nine months later, of February 2016, in AIPS 79th Congress in Doha, Qatar, SJAK became full member of AIPS (International Sports Press Association). In next four years he represented Kosovo in the three other AIPS Congresses which was held in Seoul, Brussels and Lausanne. Every year from 2016, he is in voting panel for The Guardian choosing top 100 footballers of the year.

Football commentary career
Besides commenting on the matches from the Football Superleague of Kosovo, Sadiku has also commented on matches from the Premier League, Champions League, Europa League, Serie A, etc. Until now Sadiku has commented more than 1,665 football games, particularly in the Premier League. He has covered all the games of the Kosovo national team, since they are full member of UEFA and FIFA in May 2016.

Other work
He has cooperated with Football Federation of Kosovo, from 2015 to 2018 where he worked as a statistician. But left the job after Agim Ademi became the head of the federation and began a feud against him.

Family and personal life
Arlind Sadiku is married to Edita Ademi and they have two children, Meris and Siar.

References

External links

Living people
1989 births
Kosovan journalists
Association football commentators
Writers from Pristina